Cardamine parviflora, commonly known as small-flowered bittercress or sand bittercress, is a species of flowering plant belonging to the family Brassicaceae.

Its native range is temperate Eurasia, subarctic America to Northern, Central, and Eastern United States.

References

parviflora